Aitor Córdoba Querejeta (born 21 May 1995) is a Spanish footballer who plays for Burgos CF as a central defender.

Club career
Born in Bilbao, Biscay, Basque Country, Córdoba was a SD Leioa youth graduate. He made his first team debut in the 2012–13 season, in Tercera División, and featured sparingly in the following campaign, as the club achieved promotion to Segunda División B.

From 2014 onwards, Córdoba established himself as a regular starter for Leioa, being the team captain as the club remained in the third level. On 30 June 2019, he agreed to a deal with fellow third division side Burgos CF.

A regular starter in his first season, Córdoba was mainly a backup option in his second, as his club returned to Segunda División after 19 years. He made his professional debut on 15 August 2021, starting in a 0–1 away draw against Sporting de Gijón.

Personal life
Córdoba has two younger brothers who are also footballers. Iñigo and Asier, both wingers, were Athletic Bilbao youth graduates. Their sister Ainhoa (born 2001) plays for Leioa's women's team in the Basque regional league.

References

External links

1995 births
Living people
Footballers from Bilbao
Spanish footballers
Association football defenders
Segunda División players
Segunda División B players
Tercera División players
SD Leioa players
Burgos CF footballers